Nogent-sur-Oise (literally Nogent on Oise) is a commune in the French department of Oise, administrative region of Hauts-de-France (Picardy as former region). It lies adjacent to the north of the larger town Creil.

Population

International relationships
Nogent-sur-Oise is twinned with:
  Gersthofen, Bavaria, Germany since 1969
  Beverley, United Kingdom since 1998
  Aida Camp, Palestine since 2009
  Fucecchio, Tuscany, Italy since 2014

In February 2020, Nogent-sur-Oise suspended its partnership with the Polish town of Kraśnik as a reaction to the passing of an anti-LGBT resolution by the Kraśnik local authorities. In April 2021, the controversial resolution was repealed by the town council.

In popular culture
Nogent-sur-Oise is the town where the character Jacob once lived with his family in the Newbery Honor-winning book The Inquisitor's Tale. Half the village was burned down by Christian boys on a dare.

See also
 Communes of the Oise department

References

Communes of Oise
Oise communes articles needing translation from French Wikipedia